Jean-Baptiste Bouchardon (16 May 1667 – 15 January 1742) was a 17th/18th-century French sculptor and architect.

Biography 

Born in Saint-Didier-en-Velay, Bouchardon was the son of the merchant Anthoine Bouchardon and his wife Gabrielle Trinquet.

His father had a good situation in Velay as Jean-Baptiste Bouchardon's godfather and godmother showed. We don't know why he left Velay and how he learned to sculpt. Alphonse Roserot supposes that his father had opposed his son's wish and that he had to leave Velay to satisfy his desire, but Henry Ronot indicates in his book that he trained at the École des beaux-arts de Lyon.

Jean-Baptiste Bouchardon in Chaumont 
On 29 October 1692, he married Anne Cheré (died in July 1737) at Chaumont-en-Bassigny, the daughter of Joachim Cheré (1641–1708), master cobbler, and Anne Jacquin (..-1712). Guiète Cheré, Anne Chéré's brother, was a sculptor at Chaumont.

He probably arrived a few years before 1692 in Chaumont-en-Bassigny to settle in the city comfortably enough to marry there. There are no documents left to specify this date. Alphonse Roserot proposes the date 1690. The young spouses settled in a house that was given to them and where the couple's sixteen children were born. Of these, three were sculptors: the older, Edmé Bouchardon (1698-1762), Jacques-Philippe Bouchardon (1711- Stockholm 1753), who made a career in Sweden as the first sculptor of the Swedish king, and Jacquette Bouchardon who took over the paternal workshop.

Jacquette Bouchardon worked young in his father's workshop for the gilding of altarpieces, bas-reliefs and statues. Edmé Bouchardon worked with his father in 1715 at the earliest, before he joined the workshop of Coustou the elder in 1721. Jacques Bouchardon began sculpting with his father only in 1726, but left the studio in 1730 to become a soldier, but three years later he asked for the family's support to free himself from this service. His brother Edmé on his return from Rome, stayed in his Parisian apartment from 1734 to 1737/1739. It was probably through the Count of Caylus, Edmé's protector, and Edmé himself who had made several trips to Sweden, that Jacques-Philippe Bouchardon was recruited to come and work in Sweden from 1741.

In a letter dated 31 July 1737, from Jean-Baptiste Bouchardon to his son Edmé, after his wife died, he wrote that for a long time they had been very poor.

He died in his home, rue Chaude in Chaumont, aged 74 on 15 January 1742. He had made his will on 27 décembre 1741.

Jean-Baptiste Bouchardon as wood-carver 
The first mention of one of his works dates from 1698 for a tabernacle with altarpiece, carved and gilded wood, intended for the church of Saint-Urbain.

Jean-Baptiste Bouchardon made wooden copies of two statues of his son for the église Saint-Sulpice of Paris: Christ leaned on the Cross and Virgin of sorrow. They were still in Jean-Baptiste Bouchardon's studio when he died but in the Longuay abbey in 1744. They were deposited in the Chaumont museum during the French Revolution before being housed in the Saint-Jean-Baptiste de Chaumont basilica.

Stone sculptures 

If for reasons of economy, Jean-Baptiste Bouchardon often carved in wood, he made stone sculptures for the altar of the convent church of the Ursulines of Chaumont in 1712, whose design is still preserved. The different elements exist but have been dispersed in different buildings. The whole was paid 13,400 livres.

The sculptures disappeared from the church and the bas-relief of the martyrdom of St. Stephen was moved above the portal of the Saint-Bénigne Cathedral.

In Dijon, he also signed a contract in 1718 with the Ursulines for two oak wooden altars for two new chapels in their church. The contract was also signed by François Dussaussoy, "master sculptor in Dijon", who had been a Bouchardon worker. Bouchardon committed himself to carving in stone the representations of Saint Augustine and Saint Joseph. He also executed two medallions. This work was paid for in 1725.

In 1721, he signed the contract for the mausoleum of the Marquis of Rennepont for the church of Roches-Bettaincourt, now missing.

Between 1732 and 1737, there was an exchange of 16 letters between Bouchardon and the Marquis d'Orménans concerning statues and busts that the Marquis had commissioned from the sculptor for his castle of Loulans. The Marquis complains about the slowness of construction and the quality of the stones. Bouchardon tired of the Marquis' complaints tried to have this contract cancelled. But the statues placed outside did not resist the frost. The last two statues were delivered to the Marquis in 1745 by Jacquette Bouchardon.

For Joseph-Bernard Soyrot (1650-1730), he had executed busts placed on consoles in his house in Châtillon-sur-Seine. Those busts are gone.

Jean-Baptiste Bouchardon as architect 
As early as 1700, Jean-Baptiste Bouchardon had taken the title of architect. He is quoted in 1718 as the city's architect and seems to have remained so until his death. His successor, Claude Legros, was not mentioned for the first time until 13 April 1742. He modified one side of the town hall square. He has most often made repairs and his works are minor: porch of the abbey church , in 1708, entrance door of the abbey of Val-des-Écoliers, in 1713, porticoed lodge, sort of greenhouse, of the castle of Chamarandes, near Chaumont, in 1736.

In 1734, he designed a project for a royal square called the Triomphe de la paix ("Triumph of Peace") composed of two concentric building belts, the one inside is quadrilobal, the other outside is polygonal and houses an economic, commercial and fiscal centre. This type of project was original and was intended for Paris to accommodate the administrative hotels of the fermiers généraux.

Public collections  
 Chaumont, :
 Projet d'élévation de la façade d'un hôpital et d'une manufacture, 1716, pencil and watercolour
 Projet pour le monument funéraire de Claude-François Gehannin, 1719, drawing
 Plan du rez-de-chaussée de la maison de Monsieur Mongin d'Albigny, prévôt de Chaumont, 1731, drawing
 Projet d'une chaire à prêcher, 1733, drawing
 Vierge de l'Assomption, wood
 Chaumont, chapelle des Jésuites: high relief
 Dijon, musée des beaux-arts de Dijon:
 Projet pour la façade de l'église , 1716, pen and ink wash on paper
 Projet de plan et élévation pour la façade de l'église Saint-Etienne de Dijon, 1717, pen and grey wash on paper
 Projet de piédestal pour la statue équestre de Louis XIV sur la , 1724, pen and grey wash on paper
 Dijon, musée d'art sacré de Dijon: one sculpture.

Some pupils 
 Edmé Bouchardon
 Jacques-Philippe Bouchardon
 Jacquette Bouchardon

Family 
From the marriage of Jean-Baptiste Bouchardon and Anne Chéré 16 children were born:
 Jacquette Bouchardon, (29 September 1694 – 16 June 1756), unmarried
 Marguerite Bouchardon, (4 November 1696 – infant death)
 Edme Bouchardon, né le 29 mai 1698, mort le 27 juillet 1742 à Paris
 Arnoult Bouchardon, (born 7 August 1699 – died in Holland
 Jean-François Bouchardon, (22 October 1700 – infant death)
 Anne Bouchardon, (22 September 1702 – 1 April 1719)
 Jean-Baptiste Bouchardon, (born 1 April 1705), militaire
 Joseph-Antoine Bouchardon, (11 April 1706 – 20 September 1720), at Ortes, Holland
 Nicolas Bouchardon, (born 7 July 1707 – died young)
 Marie ou Anne-Marie, (17 July 1708, atteinte d'aliénation mentale et enfermée dans un couvent – 27 December 1787)
 André Bouchardon, (born 7 November 1709 – died young)
 Jacques-Philippe Bouchardon, (1 May 1711, premier sculpteur du roi de Suède – 19 December 1753) in Stockholm 
 Marie-Anne ou Marianne Bouchardon, (9 April 1712 – died young)
 Nicole-Catherine Bouchardon, (22 October 1713, married to Hugues I Voillemier on 24 October 1741 – 20 Octobre 1749). From this marriage were born the only descendants of the Bouchardon family
 Marie-Thérèse Bouchardon, (23 September 1715, married to François Girard in 1742 – 1 February 1783). Two children were born, but without posterity
 Anne-Marie Bouchardon, (born 26 July 1720, died young).

References

Bibliography 
 Alphonse Roserot, Jean-Baptiste Bouchardon, sculpteur et architecte à Chaumont en Bassigny, Éditions Plon-Nourrit, 1894, 64 pages
 Alphonse Roserot, Jean-Baptiste Bouchardon, sculpteur et architecte à Chaumont en Bassigny (1667-1742), Réunion des sociétés savantes des départements à la Sorbonne. Section des beaux-arts, Ministère de l'instruction publique, 1894, 18th session Read online
 Henry Ronot, Jean-Baptiste Bouchardon. Architecte et Sculpteur, Éditions Faton, Dijon, 2002, 2. vol., 
 Alexandre Cojannot, Compte-rendu de : Henry Ronot, Jean-Baptiste Bouchardon, architecte et sculpteur, ... with collab. by S. Darroussat and V. Noël, Éditions Faton, Paris, 2002,  Bulletin Monumental, 2004, Volume 162, No 4 (Read online)
 Yvonne Rickert, Edme Bouchardon : réseau familial d’un sculpteur originaire de Chaumont, Bulletin du Centre de recherche du château de Versailles (Read online)
 Marie-Agnès Sonnier, Les retables de Jean-Baptiste Bouchardon : Aube et Haute-Marne, Dominique Guéniot publisher (series Itinéraires du patrimoine), Langres, 2005

External links 
 Bouchardon Jean Baptiste on Wikiphedias
 Jean-Baptiste Bouchardon. Architecte et sculpteur
 Base Joconde : Bouchardon Jean-Baptiste
 Base Palissy: Jean-Baptiste Bouchardon

1667 births
1742 deaths
People from Auvergne
17th-century French sculptors
18th-century French sculptors
17th-century French architects
18th-century French architects